John Douglas Walsh (born December 24, 1974) is an American actor, writer, producer, and improv comedy leader.  He is best known for his role as Gordon on Two and a Half Men. He wrote, produced and directed the show Battleground.

Early life
Walsh was born and raised as an only child in Madison, Wisconsin. His mother was a professor at the University of Wisconsin–Madison.

After graduating from Madison West High School, Walsh briefly attended the University of Minnesota before transferring to the University of California, Santa Barbara. It was there that he got involved with Theatresports. He would later transfer to and graduate from UCLA with a Bachelor of Arts in theater.

After graduating, Walsh founded Ultimate Improv with Matt Jones, an improvisational comedy club located in Westwood, Los Angeles, California. In September 2008, he and his troupe made a video spoof of Les Misérables''' "One Day More" called "Les Misbarack", which became a hit on YouTube. The theater later closed due to lack of audience.

Career
Walsh's roles have included parts in various TV shows and films, as actor, as writer, and co-executive producer, his most notable being "Mackey Nagle" on Smart Guy and as Gordon on Two and a Half Men. Walsh appeared in the 2014 film, The Amazing Spider-Man 2 as an online instructor demonstrating how batteries work.

His show Battleground'' aired on Hulu in 2012.

Filmography

References

External links

Article at Daily Bruin on UCLA.edu

1974 births
Actors from Madison, Wisconsin
People from Greater Los Angeles
Living people
Male actors from Wisconsin
American male comedians
21st-century American comedians
American male film actors
American male television actors
American television writers
American male television writers
Screenwriters from Wisconsin
21st-century American screenwriters
Madison West High School alumni
21st-century American male writers